Kupen may refer to:
Kupen, Gabrovo Province, Bulgaria
Kupen, Iran (disambiguation)